Swallen's was a chain of department stores based in Cincinnati, Ohio, United States.  The first Swallen's store opened in 1948.  The company filed for Chapter 11 bankruptcy in 1995 and all stores were closed by the end of the year.

Each Swallen's store featured all or some mixture of these product categories: appliances, electronics, hardware, sporting goods and firearms, clothing, shoes, pets, cameras, groceries, boats and marine items, automotive, toys, and gasoline.

References

Defunct department stores based in Cincinnati
Retail companies established in 1948
Retail companies disestablished in 1995
Defunct companies based in Cincinnati
1948 establishments in Ohio
1995 disestablishments in Ohio
Companies that filed for Chapter 11 bankruptcy in 1995